The following outline is provided as an overview of and topical guide to construction:

Construction – process of building or assembling infrastructure. A complex activity, large scale construction involves extensive multitasking. Normally, a job is managed by a project manager, and supervised by a construction manager, design engineer, construction engineer or project architect.

Essence of construction 

 Building
 Planning permission
 Nonbuilding structures including infrastructure

Types of construction 
 Building construction
 Home construction
 High-rise construction
Skyscraper
 Low-rise construction
 Industrial construction
 Factories
 Refineries
 Offshore construction
 Road construction 
 Underground construction
Tunnel construction

History of construction 

History of construction
 History of architecture
 History of the civil engineering profession
 History of the science of civil engineering
 History of structural engineering

General construction concepts 

 Architecture
 Architectural engineering
 Autonomous building
 Blueprint
 Builders' rites
Topping out
 Building automation
 Building code
 Building construction
 Building envelope
 Building insulation
 Building material
 Civil engineering
 Cladding
 Construction and demolition waste
 Construction bidding
 Construction contract
 Construction delay
 Construction engineering
 Construction equipment theft
 Construction loan
 Construction law
 Construction management
 Construction site safety
 Construction worker
 Deconstruction (building)
 Demolition
 Design-bid-build
 Design-build
 Engineering, procurement, and construction
 Fast-track construction
 Egyptian pyramid construction techniques
 Fire safety
 Framing
 Green building
 Green roof
 Industrialization of construction
 Occupancy
 Occupational safety
 Prefabricated buildings
 Project management
 Real estate (the product of most construction)
 Steel frame
 Sustainability in construction
 Zoning

Components of a building 
 Escalator
 Electrical wiring
 Elevator
 Fireplace
 Chimney
 Floor
 Flooring
 Foundation
 Light fixtures
 Plumbing
 Plumbing fixtures
 Roof
 Stairs
 Walls
 Doors
 Wallcoverings
 Windows
 HVAC

Construction trades workers 
List of construction trades
 Banksman
 Bricklayer
 Concrete finisher
 Construction foreman
 Electrician
 Framer
 Glazier
 House painter and decorator
 Ironworker
 Joiner
 Laborer
 Millwright
 Plasterer
 Plumber
 Rigger
 Roofer
 Slater
 Steel fixer
 Welder

Design elements of a building 
 Halls
 Entryway
 Rooms
 Bathroom
 Bedroom
 Dining room
 Garage
 Kitchen
 Living room
 Utility room

Heavy construction projects 
 Bridge
 Highway

Heavy equipment 
 Heavy equipment
 Bulldozer
 Compactor
 Excavator
 Loader
 Heavy equipment operator

Building construction methods 
List of construction methods
 Earthbag construction
 Ferrocement
 Lift slab construction
 Monocrete construction
 Slip forming

Materials and equipment 
List of building materials
 :Category:Construction equipment
 :Category:Cutting tools
 :Category:Lifting equipment
 :Category:Metalworking tools
 :Category:Power tools
 :Category:Stonemasonry tools
 :Category:Woodworking tools
 Light tower
 Living building material
 Staff
 Temporary equipment
 Box crib
 Dropcloth
 Falsework
 Fill trestle
 Formwork
 Masking tape
 Ram board
 Scaffolding
Tube and clamp scaffold
 Temporary fencing

Roles in construction 
 Building engineer
 Building estimator
 Building officials
 Chartered Building Surveyor
 Chief Construction Adviser to UK Government
 Civil estimator
 Clerk of works
 Construction foreman
 Master builder
 Quantity surveyor
 Site manager
 Structural engineer
 Superintendent (construction)

See also 
 Index of construction articles
 Megaproject
 Megastructure

External links 

 
 Associated General Contractors of America
 National Association of Home Builders

Construction